Moses Louis Annenberg (February 11, 1877 – July 20, 1942) was an American newspaper publisher, who purchased The Philadelphia Inquirer, the third-oldest surviving daily newspaper in the United States in 1936. The Inquirer has the sixteenth-largest average weekday U.S. newspaper circulation, and has won eighteen Pulitzer Prizes. He was the father of TV Guide creator Walter Annenberg.

Early life
Moses Louis Annenberg was born in Kalwischen, East Prussia (German Empire) in 1877 to a Lithuanian Jewish family. He left Germany and immigrated to Chicago in 1900.

Career
Annenberg began his career as a Chicago newspaper salesman at the Chicago Tribune, then, for the Hearst Corporation. He eventually built a fortune and the successful publishing company that became Triangle Publications, Inc., owning, among other publications, the Daily Racing Form.

During the Roosevelt administration, he was indicted for tax evasion on August 11, 1939, for income tax evasion for the years 1932, 1933, 1934, 1935 and 1936, totaling $3,258,809.97 in income taxes evaded. On April 4, 1940, Annenberg pleaded guilty to the 1936 income tax evasion count in the indictment that charged him with evading $1.2 million in taxes ($ million today). 

Judge James Herbert Wilkerson, the same judge who previously sentenced Al Capone, sentenced Annenberg to three years in prison and a fine of $8.0 million ($ million today) "the largest single tax fraud penalty in history" at the time.

Personal life, death and legacy
Annenberg married Sadie Cecillia Freedman (1879–1965). They had one son, the publisher and philanthropist Walter Annenberg, and seven daughters; Diana Annenberg (1900–1905), Esther Annenberg Simon Levee (1901–1992), Janet Annenberg Kahn Neff Hooker (1904–1997), Enid Annenberg Haupt (1906–2005), Lita Annenberg Hazen (1909–1985), Evelyn Annenberg Jaffe Hall (1911–2005), and Harriet Beatrice Annenberg Ames Aronson (1914–1976).

Annenberg was released from Lewisburg Federal Penitentiary prison on June 3, 1942, and died in the Mayo Clinic on July 20, 1942, after having surgery for a brain tumor. His Ranch A in eastern Wyoming is now listed on the National Register of Historic Places.

References

Further reading
Moses Annenberg's connection to Chicago's organized crime: Part 2 of 3
Moses Annenberg's connection to Chicago's organized crime: Part 3 of 3
Cooney, John E. The Annenbergs. New York: Simon & Schuster, 1982. 
Cooney, John "Annenberg, Moses Louis" American National Biography (1999) https://doi.org/10.1093/anb/9780198606697.article.1602545
Fried, Albert. The Rise and Fall of the Jewish Gangster in America. New York: Holt, Rinehart and Winston, 1980. 
Johnson, Curt and R. Craig Sautter. The Wicked City: Chicago from Kenna to Capone. New York: Da Capo Press, 1998. 
Reppetto, Thomas A. American Mafia: A History of Its Rise to Power. New York: Henry Holt & Co., 2004. 
Schatzberg, Rufus, Robert J.Kelly and Ko-lin Chin, ed. Handbook of Organized Crime in the United States. Westport, Connecticut: Greenwood Press, 1994.  
Winter-Berger, Robert N. The Washington Pay-Off: An Insider's View of Corruption in Government. New York: Dell Publishing, 1972.

External links
Paper Trail Annenbergs
The origins of the Mob and the Atlantic City Conference

1877 births
1942 deaths
People from East Prussia
American people convicted of tax crimes
American people of German-Jewish descent
American magazine publishers (people)
American newspaper publishers (people)
Moses
Emigrants from the German Empire to the United States